The 2015 PBA Governors' Cup Finals was the best-of-seven championship series of the 2015 PBA Governors' Cup, and the conclusion of the conference's playoffs. The Alaska Aces and the San Miguel Beermen competed for the 15th Governors' Cup championship and the 115th overall contested by the league. This also served as a finals rematch between the two teams, when San Miguel won the season's Philippine Cup championship in seven games.

The San Miguel Beermen swept Alaska in their best-of-seven series, four games to none, winning their 21st overall championship in the league.

Background

Road to the finals

Head-to-head matchup

Series summary

Game 1

Game 2

Game 3

Game 4

Rosters

{| class="toccolours" style="font-size: 95%; width: 100%;"
|-
! colspan="2" style="background-color: #; color: #; text-align: center;" | Alaska Aces 2015 PBA Governors' Cup roster
|- style="background-color:#; color: #; text-align: center;"
! Players !! Coaches
|-
| valign="top" |
{| class="sortable" style="background:transparent; margin:0px; width:100%;"
! Pos. !! # !! POB !! Name !! Height !! Weight !! !! College 
|-

  also serves as Alaska's board governor.

{| class="toccolours" style="font-size: 95%; width: 100%;"
|-
! colspan="2" style="background-color: #; color: #; text-align: center;" | San Miguel Beermen 2015 PBA Governors' Cup roster
|- style="background-color:#; color: #; text-align: center;"
! Players !! Coaches
|-
| valign="top" |
{| class="sortable" style="background:transparent; margin:0px; width:100%;"
! Pos. !! # !! POB !! Name !! Height !! Weight !! !! College 
|-

Broadcast notes

Additional Game 4 crew:
Trophy presentation: James Velasquez
Dugout interviewer: Apple David

References

External links
 PBA official website

2015
2014–15 PBA season
San Miguel Beermen games
Alaska Aces (PBA) games
PBA Governors' Cup Finals